María Fernanda Quiroz Gil  (born 25 August 1986) is a Mexican actress.

Life and career 
Born in Mexico City, Quiroz studied acting at the Centro de Estudios y Formación Actoral of TV Azteca. She made her professional debut in 2006, in Montecristo, and from then she appeared in several telenovelas. In 2015, she was a contestant in the reality show La Isla, a Mexican version of Celebrity Survivor.

Selected filmography 

 Montecristo (2006) 
 Se Busca Un Hombre (2007) 
 Pasión morena (2009)
 Quererte así (2012) 
  Destino (2013)
 Las Bravo (2014)

Realitys shows

References

External links
 
  
 

1979 births
Living people
Mexican television actresses